Mount James is the highest mountain in the Helicopter Mountains of the Saint Johns Range, rising to 1700 meters between Mick Peak and Hott Peak. Named by the Advisory Committee on Antarctic Names in 2007 after Barry Wendell James, a helicopter pilot in support of the U.S. Antarctic Program at McMurdo Sound and the McMurdo Dry Valleys in 10 austral field seasons, from 1998–99 to 2007–08.

References

James